Aleksander Erkman (''''; 23 November 1894 Pärnu – 10 November 1975 Pärnu) was an Estonian politician. He was a member of II Riigikogu. He was a member of the Riigikogu since 29 February 1924. He replaced Vladimir Kangur. On 5 April 1924, he resigned his position and he was replaced by Eduard Parts.

References

1894 births
1975 deaths
People from Pärnu
People from Kreis Pernau
Workers' United Front politicians
Members of the Riigikogu, 1923–1926